Wives Under Suspicion is a 1938 American crime film based on a 1932 Ladislas Fodor play that was previously adapted into the film, The Kiss Before the Mirror. This version was directed by James Whale and stars Warren William, Gail Patrick, Ralph Morgan, and Constance Moore. It released by Universal Pictures. In 1966, the film entered the public domain in the United States because the claimants did not renew its copyright registration in the 28th year after publication.

Plot
A district attorney Jim Stowell (Warren William) realizes that his own wife (Gail Patrick) might be having an affair while he is prosecuting a cuckolded murderer.

Cast
 Warren William as District Attorney Jim Stowell
 Gail Patrick as Lucy Stowell
 Ralph Morgan as Professor Shaw MacAllen
 William Lundigan as Phil
 Constance Moore as Elizabeth
 Cecil Cunningham as "Sharpy"
 Jonathan Hale as Dan Allison
 Lillian Yarbo as Creola
 Milburn Stone as Eddie Kirk
 J. Anthony Hughes as Murphy 
 Samuel S. Hinds as David Marrow
 Edward LeSaint as Judge (uncredited)

Earlier version
Wives Under Suspicion is a remake of a film also directed by Whale, The Kiss Before the Mirror (1933). Ralph Morgan, brother of Frank Morgan, who plays the prosecutor in The Kiss Before the Mirror, appears in the remake.

References

External links
 
 
 
 
 
 Wives Under Suspicion on YouTube

1938 films
1930s English-language films
American courtroom films
Films directed by James Whale
Remakes of American films
1938 crime drama films
American crime drama films
American black-and-white films
American films based on plays
1930s American films